William Wilson Fife (August 16, 1857 – August 31, 1897) was a 19th-century architect of Richardsonian Romanesque in Ogden, Utah. His works include the Second Empire Ogden City Hall, Scowcroft Block, Perry's Block, the Utah Territorial Reform School, the Woodmansee-Union Block, Utah Loan & Trust Building, and Ogden High School. Some of Fife's works have been added to the National Register of Historic Places, including the Valasco Farr House and a residence at 2523 Jefferson Ave that is part of the Jefferson Avenue Historic District.

See also
William N. Fife, his father

Sources

1857 births
1897 deaths
Architects from Utah
Architects of Latter Day Saint religious buildings and structures
19th-century American architects
Artists from Ogden, Utah